Telma Santos (born 1 August 1983) is a Portuguese badminton player. She competed for Portugal at the 2012 and at the 2016 Summer Olympics. Santos is the niece of Fernando Silva, a badminton player who also represented Portugal in the 1992 Summer Olympics.

In 2021, Santos won a gold medal in the women's singles 35+ category at the 2021 BWF World Senior Championships in Huelva.

Achievements

World Senior Championships 
Women's singles

BWF International Challenge/Series 
Women's singles

Women's doubles

Mixed doubles

  BWF International Series tournaments
  BWF Future Series tournament

References 

1983 births
Living people
People from Peniche, Portugal
Portuguese female badminton players
Badminton players at the 2012 Summer Olympics
Badminton players at the 2016 Summer Olympics
Olympic badminton players of Portugal
Sportspeople from Leiria District